Starsky & Hutch is a vehicular combat video game by British studio Mind's Eye Productions based on the television series of the same name created by William Blinn. The game was released for Microsoft Windows, PlayStation 2, Xbox, Game Boy Advance and GameCube.

Plot and gameplay
The game follows the adventures of David Michael Starsky and Kenneth 'Hutch' Hutchinson as they clean up Bay City in their Gran Torino.

The game features asymmetric multiplayer gameplay, in which one player controls Starsky as he drives the car whilst another controls Hutch as he shoots enemies and obstacles. These can be performed with various steering wheel and lightgun peripherals, such as the Guncon 2. In single player, players can drive as Starsky with shooting either set to free or auto aim.

The game consists of three 'seasons' consisting of several 'episodes'. In each episode, players need to complete objectives, such as chasing down criminals or escorting other vehicles, whilst also keeping Viewer Ratings high. Throughout the game there are various icons the player can either shoot or drive through, offering bonuses such as increased grip, higher viewer ratings and more powerful weapons, as well as special events such as jumping off ramps.

The game has a 70s style presentation and features the original voice of Huggy Bear, Antonio Fargas.

Reception

Starsky & Hutch received "mixed" reviews on all platforms except the Game Boy Advance version, which received "generally unfavorable reviews", according to video game review aggregator Metacritic.

Notes

References

External links
Starsky & Hutch at GameSpot
Starsky & Hutch at Giant Bomb
Starsky & Hutch at IMDb

2003 video games
Game Boy Advance games
GameCube games
Light gun games
Multiplayer and single-player video games
PlayStation 2 games
Starsky & Hutch
Vehicular combat games
Video games about police officers
Video games scored by Tim Follin
Video games developed in Germany
Video games developed in the United Kingdom
Video games set in California
Video games set in the 1970s
Windows games
Xbox games
RenderWare games
Video games based on television series
Video games using Havok
Empire Interactive games
Supersonic Software games
Mind's Eye Productions games